is a Japanese archer. He competed in the men's individual event at the 2020 Summer Olympics. and won a bronze medal as a member of the Japanese Men's team.

References

External links
 

1997 births
Living people
Japanese male archers
Olympic archers of Japan
Archers at the 2020 Summer Olympics
Place of birth missing (living people)
Medalists at the 2020 Summer Olympics
Olympic medalists in archery
Olympic bronze medalists for Japan
21st-century Japanese people